Directors of Photography is the fifth studio album by American hip hop group Dilated Peoples. The album was released on August 12, 2014, by Rhymesayers Entertainment. The album features guest appearances from Vince Staples, Aloe Blacc, Catero, Gangrene, Sick Jacken, Krondon, Fashawn, Rapsody, Domo Genesis, Vinnie Paz and Action Bronson.

Background
In a June 2012, interview with AllHipHop, Evidence spoke about the album, saying: "Directors of Photography is the next Dilated Peoples album and I’m excited about it, nervous about it, everything in between. We never broke up or anything like that, we’ve been supporting each other on our solo missions. Most people who know the details about Dilated know that we’re solo artists who came together to make something bigger and this is just a return to genesis so to speak." He continued: "Sometimes we’ve got to be conscious of each other when we’re in a group because not all of our views reflect each others visions all the time. So it’s been fun to just do what we wanted to do in these off years, solo, expressing ourselves. I think our next Dilated record could really be a great sound because of this freedom we’ve had. I’m looking forward to it." In an October 2013, interview with HipHopDX, DJ Babu spoke about the recording process, saying: "In this process, not that much has changed. You'd be surprised how easily you fall back into your roles and understand where you fit in with each other. Being in the studio is definitely something that we love and something that we would probably do whether we had a Dilated album to work on or not. We're like studio rats. Ev was definitely producing the shit out of this record. All of us, but Ev was really striving for a sound. We still are striving for a particular cohesive sound that we're trying to get. Things have changed since we've been around, but we're trying to walk a fine line between keeping it classic and pushing it forward...We've spent a lot of time sharpening our swords and I feel like Ev's been leading us in that direction, to really try new things while still being us."

Evidence spoke about the album's production, saying: "Babu and I are doing the majority of the production, which is very different from when we were just excited to have two or three tracks on an album before. I think we still are excited just to have two or three [songs on the album], but it's working out that we're getting more. It changes everything when you are really self-making an album and not hiring people. It's really different. Not to mention, we're making music in our studio with different mixing techniques. We're from an analog era, so we're doing things differently right now."

Rakaa Iriscience also spoke on the album's production, saying: "Before we even started the record, they kind of took on the responsibility of being the main producers for the album. That means figuring out what's gonna happen to the beats, but that also means making the songs the best they can be, even if they didn't make the beat. It is a very personal thing, but to see how much both of them have internalized it emotionally, the passion is very much there. It's kind of a two-edged sword, really, but ultimately, Dilated Peoples has made our best work when there's some kind of friction that leads to some kind of heed, when everyone sees something out of the potential and we're all just figuring out how to stress the same thing. On this record, there's been a lot of that magic. I think a lot of that has come out of Ev and Babs being very personal...In this group, I think Ev and Babs have really brought direction to the table."

Evidence also spoke about why they chose Directors of Photography as the album title, saying: "I always said that Directors of Photography would be a dope title so I could tie some personal stuff that I wanted to with my mom's situation or photography or whatever. I think that's the dynamic of this album, learning from our personal experiences and bringing it to Dilated. We used to rap about rapping. We would rap about how we were tight, or we would have an anthem, or we'd make a concept and rap around the concept, but this time, I think, we're letting who we are show a little bit. We've done so much growth as solo artists. To not bring it up at all here and pretend we haven't had this off time or we haven't had this growth period, it would be a disservice."

Critical reception

Directors of Photography was met with generally positive reviews. At Metacritic, which assigns a normalized rating out of 100 to reviews from critics, the album received an average score of 75, which indicates "generally positive reviews", based on 6 reviews. David Jeffries of AllMusic said, "The interludes, the album's title, and the instant photos packed into the album's physical release all point to a photography concept that doesn't stick to the bones, but it's the only time this effort trips on its own ambition, and it's just a slight stumble. Otherwise, this is the satisfying return album fans have waited for, no more, and certainly no less." Kevin Catchpole of PopMatters stated, "Directors of Photography marks Dilated Peoples’ first proper full length since returning to the independent scene, and that stamp is all over it. It harkens back to the clever minimalism of The Platform, while incorporating all they’ve learned since their early days as a group. And though it is an uneven affair, it’s a welcome breath of fresh air in the hip-hop world of 2014." Homer Johnsen of HipHopDX said, "Directors of Photography is a top-notch effort. Production and lyrics are both outstanding, and there are few qualms, if none at all. Ten years have passed since “This Way” was all over the radio, but Directors of Photography sounds like exactly the same Dilated Peoples formula they’ve been using since The Platform. This time, however, it’s elevated both lyrically and musically. Production trends and rhyme patterns can often be representative of time and era. Directors of Photography, transcends this notion, and in the best way possible. With the cobwebs brushed away and an apparent hunger for more, Dilated Peoples step up and deliver in every aspect."

Praverb of XXL stated, "Back in 2006, Dilated Peoples released their fourth studio album and it received mixed reviews. Eight years later, their latest album showcases the maturation of the group and the ability to truly control the process of starting from scratch. Directors of Photography shows that three artists that have achieved individual success can come together once again to create something substantial despite years of inactivity."

Commercial performance
The album debuted at number 41 on the Billboard 200 chart, with first-week sales of 6,566 copies in the United States.

Track listing

Charts

References

2014 albums
Dilated Peoples albums
Rhymesayers Entertainment albums
Albums produced by Evidence (musician)
Albums produced by the Alchemist (musician)
Albums produced by DJ Premier
Albums produced by Oh No (musician)
Albums produced by 9th Wonder
Albums produced by Jake One
Albums produced by Diamond D